Montessori may refer to:

 Maria Montessori (1870–1952), Italian physician, educator, philosopher, humanitarian and founder of 
 Montessori education
 Elisa Montessori (born 1931), Italian painter
 Montessori, a crater on Venus

See also
 Montessori school (disambiguation)
 American Montessori Society